The Board of Patent Appeals and Interferences (BPAI) was an administrative law body of the United States Patent and Trademark Office (USPTO) which decided issues of patentability. Under the America Invents Act, the BPAI was replaced with the Patent Trial and Appeal Board (PTAB), effective September 16, 2012.

Structure
The BPAI was primarily made up of an Appeals Division and a Trial Division. The Appeals Division, with over 100 Administrative Patent Judges, handled appeals of patent examiner rejections, with sections adjudicating different technology areas. The Trial Division, with 11 Administrative Patent Judges as of 2008, handled contested cases or interference proceedings. The BPAI was headed by a Chief Administrative Patent Judge with a Vice Chief. As of mid-2013, the Chief Administrative Patent Judge was James Donald Smith.

Procedures
An applicant could appeal the examiner's decision to the BPAI. The appeal procedure was described in chapter 1200 of the U.S. Manual of Patent Examining Procedure (MPEP). Typically, appeals to the BPAI were conducted ex parte. Decisions of the BPAI were typically rendered as an opinion.

Appeals
Decisions of the BPAI could be further appealed to the United States Court of Appeals for the Federal Circuit (CAFC) under .  The decisions of the CAFC may also be reviewed on a discretionary basis by the United States Supreme Court.  The U.S. Supreme Court is the ultimate authority on the judicial standards for patentability.

The United States Congress, however, can change the patent laws and thus override a decision of the Supreme Court.

An alternative path was a civil action against the Director of the United States Patent and Trademark Office in the U.S. District Court for the District of Columbia under . Any appeal arising from such a case would then be directed to the CAFC under .

Constitutionality
In 2007, Professor John F. Duffy, a widely recognized patent law scholar, argued that, since 2000, the process of appointing judges to the BPAI has been unconstitutional, because the judges were appointed by the Director of the U.S. Patent and Trademark Office rather than by the Secretary of Commerce (a "Head of Department" under the Appointments clause of the Constitution).  This problem has since been rectified and current Administrative Patent Judges are appointed by the Secretary of Commerce.

See also 
 Appeal procedure before the European Patent Office
 Ex parte Gutta (2009)
 Trademark Trial and Appeal Board (TTAB)

References

External links 
 Board of Patent Appeals and Interferences (BPAI) on the USPTO web site
 Search Decisions and Orders from the Patent Trial and Appeal Board (PTAB) from Docket Alarm.
United States patent law
Article I tribunals
United States Patent and Trademark Office
Courts and tribunals with year of establishment missing
2012 disestablishments in the United States
Courts and tribunals disestablished in 2012